Palmira is a feminine given name. People with the name are as follows:

Palmira Barbosa (born 1961), Angolan Olympic athlete
Palmira Bastos (1875–1967), Portuguese stage actor
Palmira Brummett, American historian
Palmira Jaquetti i Isant (1895–1963), Spanish folklorist and poet
Palmira Maciel (born 1961), Portuguese politician
Palmira Marçal (born 1984), Brazilian basketball player
Palmira Omiccioli, known as Eleonora Rossi Drago (1925–2007), Italian film actress 
Palmira N. Ríos (born 1956), Afro-Puerto Rican academic 
Palmira Silva (died 2014), Italian woman who was beheaded in London

Fictional characters
 Palmira, one of the major characters in Voltaire's play Mahomet

See also
 Palmira (disambiguation), related disambiguation page

Latin feminine given names